Fox Chase is a neighborhood in Northeast Philadelphia, Pennsylvania.

History

Fox Chase was originally part of Lower Dublin Township, also known as Dublin Township, a defunct township that was located in Philadelphia County, Pennsylvania. The township ceased to exist and was incorporated into the City of Philadelphia following the passage of the Act of Consolidation, 1854.

Philadelphia's elite once flocked to opulent vacation homes built in the lush fringes bordering the city. The area's character changed with the arrival of the railroad in 1876. Many of Philadelphia's aristocracy began to discover the attractiveness of suburban living, and built mansions here, using the railroad for convenient transport into the city. 

Fox Chase was the setting for one of America's longest running cold cases. In February 1957, the battered body of a small boy was found in a cardboard box off in the woods off Susquehanna Road. Investigators were mystified and were unable to determine his identity. Nicknamed "The Boy in the Box", "America's Unknown Child", and sometimes "The Fox Chase Boy", his case remains open. He was identified as Joseph Augustus Zarelli in 2022.

Location and surrounding areas
The Fox Chase section is located on the border with Montgomery County and there is an active and cooperative business community that crosses the county line into Rockledge and Huntingdon Valley.

One of many parks located within Fox Chase is Pennypack Park. It is composed of woodlands, meadows and wetlands. The banks of the Pennypack Creek runs through the park from Pine Road in Fox Chase all the way to the Delaware River. The area also includes playgrounds, hiking and bike trails as well as bridle paths for horseback riding. The Pennypack Environmental Center on Verree Road is also located within the neighborhood. Many historic structures are still intact throughout Fox Chase. The Verree House on Verree Road was the site of a raid by British troops during the American Revolutionary War. The trained eye can rediscover abandoned railroad grades, remnants of early mills, mill races and other reminders that generations of mankind have gathered in the "Green Heart" of Northeast Philadelphia.
Fox Chase Farm is one of the few remaining active farms in Philadelphia County and is used extensively by the School District of Philadelphia. It began in 1683 as a land grant from William Penn to Lord Stanley and then passed to the McVeigh family for over 100 years. Later, the Wistar family developed it into a self-sufficient farm until it became a Gentlemen's Farm owned by two farmers, Lorimer and Butler. Friends of Fox Chase Farm, an all-volunteer group, currently assists in maintaining and preserving this pastoral treasure for present and future generations.

William Rhawn, president of the National Bank of the Republic in 1879, built a summer residence here. To design the project, he chose architect Frank Furness, whose work was synonymous with the mansions and public buildings of the Gilded Age. The banker's country estate includes a carriage house and gatekeeper's house. He called the estate “Knowlton” because it resembled the estate in England of Rhawn's wife's great-grandfather, John Knowles. It has since been converted into a catering establishment.

Ryerss Mansion is also located in Fox Chase. The house was built by merchant Joseph Waln Ryerss in 1859 and dramatically overlooks Burholme Park, one of the highest vistas in Philadelphia. The mansion is home to a massive and eccentric collection of artifacts and antiquities from around the world, collected during the Ryerss family's extensive travels and exotic sojourns, from Europe, to Africa, to the Far East.

Among the historic properties located in this neighborhood are:
 Knowlton Mansion, designed by Frank Furness; on the National Register of Historic Places
 Ryerss Mansion, home of Joseph Waln Ryerss; on the National Register of Historic Places
 The Verree House, site of a raid by British troops during the American Revolutionary War

Demographics

The median age is 36.6 years for males and 39.0 years for females. Married couples made up 40.3 percent of the neighborhood's population. The neighborhood was 80.37 Caucasian, 8.63 percent African American, 4.75 percent Asian, 2.58 percent mixed race, .07 percent Native Hawaiian and 3.6 percent other race.

The median household income for Fox Chase was $54,870 in 2011, compared with $34,207 for Philadelphia as a whole. The population below the poverty level in Fox Chase was 10 percent, compared with 28.4 percent for Philadelphia.

Business

The largest employer of Fox Chase is the internationally known Fox Chase Cancer Center, a unique facility that merges cancer research with the treatment of cancer. Its researchers have won Nobel Prizes for their contributions.

Transportation
Public transportation is provided by several SEPTA bus routes and the Fox Chase Line regional rail service which terminates near Rhawn Street and Oxford Avenue.

Education

Public libraries
The Fox Chase Branch of the Philadelphia Free Library is located at 501 Rhawn St. at Jeanes Street.

Schools
Fox Chase Elementary School a.k.a. Fox Chase Academics Plus School is a public elementary school of the School District of Philadelphia. Located at 500 Rhawn St. near the library, it serves children grades K to 5.

Students move on to Baldi Middle School, and George Washington High School.

Saint Cecilia is a Roman Catholic School, from grades pre-k to 8. Saint Cecilia's is a part of the Archdiocese of Philadelphia. Saint Cecilia School and church is located on 535 Rhawn St.

Houses of worship

Fox Chase United Methodist Church is located at 201 Loney St. at the intersection of Filmore and Loney streets.
St. Cecilia Catholic Church, 535 Rhawn St., also has a school with grades from kindergarten to eighth grade. The "new" church opened in 1955 and the first church was located just to the west of the "new" church. It was built underground with the expectations of adding an upper level, but the depression in 1929 and World War II caused this addition to be held off until 1955.
St. Stephen Orthodox Cathedral is located at 8598 Verree Road (next to Pennypack Park).
Bethel International Missions Center, 460 Rhawn St., a Brazilian congregation.
Memorial Presbyterian Church of Fox Chase, 7902 Oxford Ave., founded in 1884.

Location
Fox Chase's boundaries are:
 Northeast/East, Pennypack Creek (Bustleton, Philadelphia, Pennsylvania)
 West/Northwest, Filmore Street (Rockledge, Pennsylvania and Abington, Pennsylvania)
 Southwest, Township Line Road (Cheltenham, Pennsylvania)
 South, Cottman Avenue (Lawncrest, Philadelphia, Cheltenham Township and Elkins Park, Pennsylvania)
 East, Algon Avenue (Rhawnhurst section of Philadelphia)

See also 

 Fox Chase Cancer Center
Knowlton Mansion

References

External links
 Fox Chase Facebook Group
 Fox Chase Homeowners Association
 Fox Chase Soccer Club
 Fox Chase Elementary School
 Facebook profile 
 Fox-Rok Athletic Association
 Rieker's Prime Meats
 Historic Photographs of Fox Chase, PhillyHistory.org
 St. Mary's Ukrainian Cemetery / 438 Cedar Road, Fox Chase, Pennsylvania.

 
Neighborhoods in Philadelphia
1705 establishments in Pennsylvania